Cedar Township is one of twelve townships in Floyd County, Iowa, USA.  As of the 2000 census, its population was 305.

Geography
According to the United States Census Bureau, Cedar Township covers an area of 31.87 square miles (82.54 square kilometers).

Unincorporated towns
 Howardville at 
(This list is based on USGS data and may include former settlements.)

Adjacent townships
 Afton Township, Howard County (northeast)
 East Lincoln Township, Mitchell County (northeast)
 Deerfield Township, Chickasaw County (east)
 Niles Township (southeast)
 Floyd Township (southwest)
 West Lincoln Township, Mitchell County (northwest)

Cemeteries
The township contains Howardville Cemetery.

Major highways
  U.S. Route 218

Airports and landing strips
 Henry Airport

School districts
 Charles City Community School District
 Osage Community School District

Political districts
 Iowa's 4th congressional district
 State House District 14
 State Senate District 7

References
 United States Census Bureau 2008 TIGER/Line Shapefiles
 United States Board on Geographic Names (GNIS)
 United States National Atlas

External links
 US-Counties.com
 City-Data.com

Townships in Floyd County, Iowa
Townships in Iowa